A haunted attraction may refer to the following:
A haunted attraction (simulated), a form of entertainment that simulates the experience of a haunted location or horror fiction
A reportedly haunted house (non-fictional attraction) or similar location that attracts tourists for reasons of its reputation

See also
List of reportedly haunted locations